Andrew Thomas Campbell (born May 15, 1959) is a computer scientist who works in the field of ubiquitous computing. He is best known for his research on mobile sensing, applied machine learning and human behavioral modeling.

Campbell is the Albert Bradley 1915 Third Century professor in computer science at Dartmouth College. He joined Dartmouth Computer Science in 2005 after spending 10 years as a professor of Electrical Engineering at Columbia University. Prior to being on the faculty at Columbia, Campbell spent 10 years in the software industry working on the research and development of wireless networks and operating systems. He has worked on digital health as a visiting research scientist in the Android group at Google and at Verily Life Sciences.

Campbell has received a number of awards including the ACM SIGMOBILE Test of Time Paper Award for pioneering sensing and machine learning on smartphones.

Personal life
Campbell was born in Coventry, England on May 15, 1959. He received a BSc in Mechanical Engineering from Aston University (1981) and then an MSc. in Computer Science from City, University of London.  He worked in the software industry for a decade in England, the Netherlands and the USA before returning to university. He received his PhD in Computer Science from Lancaster University (1996).

He started as an assistant professor of Electrical Engineering at Columbia University in 1996 and was promoted to an associated professor with tenure in 2003. After a sabbatical year as a visiting professor at Cambridge University, he joined Dartmouth College in 2005.  In 2018, he was named the Albert Bradley 1915 Third Century professor at Dartmouth College.

Career 
Campbell is best known for his work in ubiquitous computing, where he and his students first implemented sensing and machine learning algorithms on the iPhone when it was released in 2007. He is also known for the development of the StudentLife app (2014).

At Dartmouth, he led the StudentLife Study tracking 200 undergraduate students across their 4 years of college using smartphone sensing and brain imaging to better understand the dynamics of mental health of students across their college years. This study was also the first to use mobile sensing to capture the impact of  COVID-19 on student behavior and mental health outcomes during the pandemic. He has also studied mental health and performance in the workplace using mobile sensing.

Awards and recognition
Campbell has received an NSF CAREER Award, IBM Faculty Award, AT&T Faculty Award, Google Faculty Award and EPSRC Fellow Award. His group received the ACM ACM SenSys Test of Time Award (2018) and the ACM SIGMOBILE Test of Time Award (2019) for their work on the CenceMe app (2008).

Selected bibliography
Emiliano Miluzzo, Nicholas D. Lane, Kristóf Fodor, Ronald A. Peterson, Hong Lu, Mirco Musolesi, Shane. B. Eisenman, Xiao Zheng, Andrew T. Campbell, Sensing Meets Mobile Social Networks: The Design, Implementation and Evaluation of the CenceMe Application. Proc. of 6th ACM Conference on Embedded Networked Sensor Systems (SenSys '08), Raleigh, NC, USA, Nov. 5–7, 2008. ACM SIGMOBILE Test of Time Award
Rui Wang, Fanglin Chen, Zhenyu Chen, Tianxing Li, Gabriella Harari, Stefanie Tignor, Xia Zhou, Dror Ben-Zeev, and Andrew T. Campbell, StudentLife: Assessing Behavioral Trends, Mental Well-being and Academic Performance of College Students using Smartphones, ACM International Joint Conference on Pervasive and Ubiquitous Computing (UbiComp 2014), September 2014. Best Paper Nomination Award
Huckins J, daSilva A, Wang W, Hedlund E, Rogers C, Nepal S, Wu J, Obuchi M, Murphy E, Meyer M, Wagner D, Holtzheimer P, Campbell A Mental Health and Behavior of College Students During the Early Phases of the COVID-19 Pandemic: Longitudinal Smartphone and Ecological Momentary Assessment Study, Journal of Medical Internet Research. 2020
Harari GM, Lane ND, Wang R, Crosier BS, Campbell AT, Gosling SD. Using Smartphones to Collect Behavioral Data in Psychological Science: Opportunities, Practical Considerations, and Challenges. Perspectives on Psychological Science. 2016
Rui Wang, Min S. H. Aung, Saeed Abdullah, Rachel Brian, Andrew T. Campbell, Tanzeem Choudhury, Marta Hauser, John Kane, Michael Merrill, Emily A. Scherer, Vincent W. S. Tseng, and Dror Ben-Zeev. 2016. CrossCheck: toward passive sensing and detection of mental health changes in people with schizophrenia. In Proceedings of the 2016 ACM International Joint Conference on Pervasive and Ubiquitous Computing (UbiComp '16). Association for Computing Machinery, New York, NY, USA, 886–897
Mikio Obuchi, Jeremy F. Huckins, Weichen Wang, Alex daSilva, Courtney Rogers, Eilis Murphy, Elin Hedlund, Paul Holtzheimer, Shayan Mirjafari, and Andrew Campbell. 2020. Predicting Brain Functional Connectivity Using Mobile Sensing. Proc. ACM Interact. Mob. Wearable Ubiquitous Technol. 4, 1, Article 23, 2020

References 

Living people
Alumni of Lancaster University
Alumni of Aston University
Alumni of City, University of London
Dartmouth College faculty
1959 births